Udaybhanu Singh  (12 February 1893 – 22 October 1954) was the ruler of Dholpur state  from 1911–1949, after which the State acceded to the Union of India. He was from the Bamraulia gotra of Jats. Udaybhanu succeeded his brother Rana Ram Singh, who died without issue in 1911. Udaybhanu  received full ruling rights on 9 October 1913.

He was educated at Mayo College, Ajmer and later joined the Imperial Cadet Corps at Dehradun.

Last ruler of Dholpur
He was the last ruler of Dholpur, and served as a delegate to the Round Table Conference in 1931. After India's independence in 1947, Maharaj Rana Udaybhanu Singh acceded Dholpur to the Union of India on 7 April 1949. Dholpur was merged with three neighbouring states to form the Matsya Union within the union of India, of which he was made Rajpramukh, but the union was later merged with several other such unions to form the present-day state of Rajasthan.

Singh died on 22 October 1954 after a 43-year reign, aged 61. He was succeeded by his grandson, Hemant Singh , who was the titular Maharaja of Dholpur.

Personal life
In April 1911, Singh married Malvender Kaur  (15 January 1893 – 12 December 1981), daughter of Shamsher Singh, the Sardar or Chieftain of Badrukhan in the state of Jind. The couple had an only daughter:
 Urmila Devi  (1924–1997). Married in 1944  Pratap Singh Nabha (1919–1995; r. 1928-1971). and had three sons and one daughter, including the second son:
 Hemant Singh

Honours
Delhi Durbar Gold Medal-1911
Knight Commander of the Order of the Star of India (KCSI)-1918
Knight Commander of the Royal Victorian Order (KCVO)-1922
Knight Grand Commander of the Order of the Indian Empire (GCIE)-1931
King George V Silver Jubilee Medal-1935
King George VI Coronation Medal-1937
Indian Independence Medal-1947

References
Ajay Kumar Agnihotri (1985) : "Gohad ke jaton ka Itihas" (Hindi)
Natthan Singh (2004) : "Jat Itihas"
Jat Samaj, Agra: October–November 2004
Natthan Singh (2005): Sujas Prabandh (Gohad ke Shasakon ki Veer gatha – by Poet Nathan), Jat Veer Prakashan Gwalior

Rulers of Dholpur state
Knights Commander of the Order of the Star of India
Knights Grand Commander of the Order of the Indian Empire
Knights Commander of the Royal Victorian Order
1893 births
1954 deaths
Indian Knights Commander of the Royal Victorian Order